The Jeu de l'année (French for Game of the Year) was a French games award, given by the Association de Promotion et d'Evaluation des Jeux in October to outstanding parlour games
 published during the previous year
 published in the French language
 available in sufficiently many stores
In 2005 the Jeu de l'année merged with the As d'Or. The 2020 edition took place on Thursday, February 20 and the nominees were announced at the end of January.

Previous awards

2004 
Winner
 Squad Seven - Roberto Fraga, TF1 Games/Fox Mind Games

Finalists
 Crazy Circus - Dominique Ehrhard, Fox Mind Games
 Queen's Necklace (Le Collier de la Reine) - Bruno Cathala and Bruno Faidutti
 Gobblet - Thierry Denoual, Gigamic
 Composio - Jean Fin, TF1 Games
 Serengeti - Michael Schacht
 Mare Nostrum - Serge Laget, Eurogames

2003 
Winner
 War of the Sheep (La Guerre des Moutons) - Philippe des Pallières, Asmodée

Finalists
 Evo - Philippe Keyaerts, Eurogames
 Werewolf (Les Loups-Garous de Thiercelieux) - Philippe des Pallières and Hervé Marly, Lui-Même
 Medina - Stefan Dorra, Hans im Glück
 San Marco - Alan R. Moon and Aaron Weissblum, Ravensburger
 Mexica - Michael Kiesling and Wolfgang Kramer, Ravensburger

See also 
 Spiel des Jahres

References

External links 
 Jeu de l'année home page (in French)

Game awards
French awards
Awards established in 2003
Awards disestablished in 2005

fr:As d'Or Jeu de l'année